Xabier "Xabi" Sánchez Bringas (born 5 May 1978) is a Spanish football manager and former player who played as a midfielder.

Playing career
Born in Oyón, Álava, Basque Country, Sánchez was an Athletic Bilbao youth graduate. After finishing his formation, he served loan stints at Tercera División sides Santutxu FC and Arenas Club de Getxo before signing for Gernika Club of the Segunda División B in 1999.

In 2001, after a year at Deportivo Alavés B, Sánchez joined Segunda División side SD Eibar. He made his professional debut on 10 October of that year, starting in a 0–1 away win against Gimnàstic de Tarragona in the season's Copa del Rey.

In 2003, Sánchez moved to Lorca Deportiva CF of the third tier, and helped in their first-ever promotion to the second division in 2005 before leaving for Benidorm CF. He subsequently represented third level sides Real Jaén, Mazarrón CF and CD Roquetas before joining SD Amorebieta in July 2009.

Sánchez was a regular starter for Amorebieta in his five-year spell, being a starter in the club's promotion campaign from the fourth tier. On 30 August 2014, he moved to Club Portugalete, and retired with the side in the following May at the age of 37.

Coaching career
Immediately after retiring Sánchez took up coaching, being an assistant at his main club Amorebieta. He was named manager of the reserves in the regional leagues on 9 July 2017, but took over the first team the following 5 February after the departure of Joseba Etxeberria.

Sánchez left the managerial role in June 2018, after the appointment of Iñigo Vélez.

References

External links

1978 births
Living people
Spanish footballers
Sportspeople from Álava
Footballers from the Basque Country (autonomous community)
Association football midfielders
Segunda División players
Segunda División B players
Tercera División players
Bilbao Athletic footballers
Arenas Club de Getxo footballers
Gernika Club footballers
Deportivo Alavés B players
SD Eibar footballers
Lorca Deportiva CF footballers
Benidorm CF footballers
Real Jaén footballers
CD Roquetas footballers
SD Amorebieta footballers
Spanish football managers
Segunda División B managers
SD Amorebieta managers
Santutxu FC players